Pavlo Arie (Ukrainian Павло Ар'є, born 16 October 1975 Lviv) is a Ukrainian playwright, artist conceptualist, and painter.

Life 
He grew up in Lviv. In 2004, he moved to Germany. He lived in Cologne where he performed in the Russian Experimental Theater of the University of Cologne's Slavic Institute.

He won a scholarship to the 2010 New Plays from Europe biennial, and of the International Program for Dramatists at Royal Court Theater

He participated at the 2013 Berliner Festspiele. From 2016 to 2017, he was curator of the  "Stückemarkt" theater festival in Heidelberg.

Works 

Ten means of suicide 2004
Revolution, Love, Death and dreams, 2005
Icon, 2006
Experiment, 2007
Colors, 2008
The Man in a State of Elevation 2010
TU TI TU TU TU 2011 - 
Glory to the Heroes 2012
At the beginning and end of time 2013
Sheep 2013 
Somewhere on the moon 2013 
So far people 2020

References 

1975 births
Ukrainian writers
Living people